Robert Bruce Elliott is an American actor, director and scriptwriter. He provided voices for a number of English versions of Japanese anime series; one of his most notable roles was Richard Moore in the detective series Case Closed. He also appeared on television and on film for a variety of shows and movies from Barney & Friends to JFK to Finding North. He is also the current voice of Ginyu, replacing Brice Armstrong in the Funimation dub of the Dragon Ball series.

Filmography

Animation

Live action

Video games

References

External links
 Official agency resume
 
 
 R. Bruce Elliott at Twitter

Living people
American male film actors
American male television actors
American male video game actors
American male voice actors
Male actors from Dallas
American voice directors
20th-century American male actors
21st-century American male actors
Year of birth missing (living people)